Trakovice is a village and municipality in Hlohovec District in the Trnava Region of western Slovakia.

History
In historical records the village was first mentioned in 1275.

Geography
The municipality lies at an altitude of 150 metres and covers an area of 11.632 km². It has a population of about 1321 people.

Notable people
 Rudolf Krajčovič, linguist

References

External links
Official web page
http://www.statistics.sk/mosmis/eng/run.html

Villages and municipalities in Hlohovec District